Youssef Daniel Fabro Khoumari (born 22 June 1996) is a British professional boxer.

Personal life
Khoumari was born in London to a Moroccan father and a Filipino mother who is a native of Alibeng, Sison, Pangasinan.

Boxing career

Amateur career
Khoumari represented Neasden IQ Boxing Club as an amateur and won over 40 fights where he had won the Southern Area title and the prestigious Haringey Box Cup.

Professional career

Lightweight division
On 9 September 2017, Khoumari made his professional debut in boxing. Khoumari defeated British boxer Andy Harris via a Round 4 (TKO). Following the bout, one month after his professional debut, Khoumari defeated British Boxer Jamie Speight, winning a points decision (PTS) through four rounds.

On 2 December 2017, Khoumari extended his winning streak in less than 3 months after defeating British boxer Joe Beeden, winning a points decision (PTS) through four rounds.

Super Lightweight division
Khoumari moved up one division, to super lightweight, and defeated British veteran boxer Kristian Laight via a points decision (PTS) through four rounds.

On 8 September 2018, more than five months after his victory against Laight, Khoumari defeated British boxer Michael Mooney via a points decision (PTS) through four rounds.

Return to Lightweight
Khoumari returned to lightweight and defeated Ukrainian boxer Dmytro Kostenko via a points decision (PTS) through four rounds. Less than a month later, Khoumari defeated British veteran boxer David Birmingham via a Round 6 (TKO).

On 9 March 2019, Khoumari defeated Latvian veteran boxer Aleksandrs Birkenbergs via a points decision (PTS) through six rounds. Three months after, Khoumari defeated British boxer Des Newton, winning a points decision (PTS) through six rounds.

Khoumari extended his winning run to ten matches by defeating British veteran boxer Lee Devine via a Round 3 (TKO).

Super Featherweight division
Following the bout, Khoumari moved down one division to super featherweight, and received his first draw of his boxing career against Liam Dillon, the match ended in a split draw (SD).

Return to Lightweight
Khoumari returned to lightweight and defeated Nicaraguan boxer Michael Isaac Carrero via a Round 2 (TKO).

Return to Super Featherweight
Khoumari returned to super featherweight and defeated British boxer Kane Baker via a Round 5 (TKO).

Six months later, it was reported that Khoumari was scheduled to face former super featherweight world title contender Vicente Martín Rodríguez on September 11, 2021 in Barcelona, Spain. Khoumari defeated Rodríguez via a majority decision (MD) through eight rounds.

Less than two months after his previous fight, it was reported that Khoumari will face American boxer, Jorge David Castañeda on 30 October 2021 in London.

Professional boxing record

References

External links

1996 births
Super-featherweight boxers
Lightweight boxers
English male boxers
Filipino male boxers
Living people